Semioli is a surname. Notable people with the surname include:

Franco Semioli (born 1980), Italian footballer
Mark Semioli (born 1968), American footballer